"Woody 'n' You", is a 1942 jazz standard written by Dizzy Gillespie as an homage to Woody Herman. It was one of three arrangements Gillespie made for Herman's big band, although it was not used at the time; the other two were "Swing Shift" and "Down Under". It was introduced on record in 1944 by Coleman Hawkins initiated by Budd Johnson, Hawkins' musical director of his 12-man orchestra that included the bebop pioneers Oscar Pettiford, Max Roach and Gillespie.

Structure
The 32-bar composition is in AABA form. The A section "consists of three two-measure sequences on ii-V chords, ending on the tonic (D)": Gm7(5) – C7(9) – Fm7(5) – B7(9) – Em7(5) – A7(9) – Dmaj9

Covers
Miles Davis recorded the song three times, Miles Davis Volume 1, Relaxin' with the Miles Davis Quintet, and the rare Amsterdam Concert.
Hampton Hawes played it in 1956 in his All Night Session! Vol. 2.
Sonny Rollins played the song on his A Night at the Village Vanguard live album in 1958.
The Three Sounds on their debut Blue Note Records album Introducing the 3 Sounds in 1958
Charles Mingus on his 1959 album A Modern Jazz Symposium of Music and Poetry
Stan Getz on Getz at the Gate in 1961
Eliane Elias included the song in her 2000 album Everything I Love.
Yusef Lateef on his live album for the Argo label Lateef at Cranbrook' in 1958.
Darryl Hall (bassist) in his album Swingin' Back with saxophonist Baptiste Herbin
Abraham Mansfarroll included it in his 2021 album Dizzy el Afrocubano''

See also
List of jazz standards

References

Songs about jazz
Songs about musicians
Cultural depictions of jazz musicians
1940s jazz standards
1942 songs
Compositions by Dizzy Gillespie